Pharmácia Popular (People's Pharmacy, English literal) is a pharmacy museum.  It is located in town of Bananal in the Brazilian state of São Paulo.

It is considered the oldest pharmacy in Brazil, founded in 1830 under the name Imperial Pharmacy, still in operation.

References 

Pharmacy museums
Museums in São Paulo (state)
Medical museums in Brazil